is a Kofun period  burial mound located in the Uchigashimacho neighborhood of the city of Ōta, Gunma Prefecture in the northern Kantō region of Japan. It was designated a National Historic Site of Japan in 1941. It is the largest kofun in Gunma Prefecture and the 28th largest in the country. It is the only kofun with a length in excess of 200 meters in eastern Japan..

Overview
The tumulus is located on a fill with an elevation of approximately 40 meters, located near the center of the city of Ōta in eastern Gunma Prefecture. There was a Shinto shrine dedicated to Tenjin located on the "neck" of the tumulus, from which the name of the kofun is derived. Although the site is truncated by Gunma Prefectural Route 2 (which skirts the posterior dome) and the Tōbu Railway Tōbu Koizumi Line tracks (which crosses the outer moat) the tumulus is in good preservation, with the inner moat intact. The tumulus has a total length of 210 meters, with both the circular portion and the anterior rectangular portion in three tiers, and is orientated to the southwest. The surface was originally covered in fukiishi and both cylindrical haniwa and figurine haniwa (shaped as people and houses) have been recovered. From the design of these haniwa, the date of construction of the tumulus can be estimated to have been from the early middle of the 5th century. The tomb was robbed in antiquity and the structure of the burial chamber is unknown, but the exposed stone sarcophagus is of a design peculiar to the Kansai region and indicates a strong connection with the Yamato kingdom. 

Approximately 300 meters to the Ōta Tenjinyama Kofun is the Nyotaizan Kofun, a large scallop-shaped (帆立貝形古墳) tumulus with has the same orientation and was built at roughly the same time. It has a separate National Historic Site designation. There is also a circular-type tumulus to the north of the Ōta Tenjinyama Kofun, with a diameter of 36 meters and height of 3.2 meters, designated "Tumulus A" on the diagram. The same types of haniwa as the Ōta Tenjinyama Kofun have been discovered an it is believed to be contemporary with that tumulus. Another tumulus, designated "B" on the diaphragm is to the southwest; however, it appears to  be a much later construction.

The identity of the person this tumulus was constructed for is unknown, but from its size and prominence, and the presence of a stone sarcophagus, it is assumed to be that of a local king  who was either an ally or an opponent to Yamato, a Kuni no miyatsuko of ancient Keno Province, or even of a general sent by Yamato to rule over Keno. Whatever the case, the person who built this tomb must have controlled the entire Keno area, as subsequent tombs were on a smaller scale and are ground into clusters corresponding to later subdivisions of the province. The Nihon Shoki mentions the "Keno clan", who were active in diplomacy with the kingdoms of the Korean Peninsula ad who participated in expeditions of the Yamato kingdom.  The relationship between the Nyotaizan Kofun and the Tenjinyama Kofun in the northeast is not clear, but a pair of tumuli consisting of a keyhole-shaped tumulus and a scalloped tumulus have been found in other locations, such as the Saitobaru Kofun (Saito, Miyazaki).

Total length 210 meters 
Anterior rectangular portion 116 meters wide x 12 meters high, 3-tier
Posterior circular portion 120 meter diameter x 16.5 meters high, 3-tier
Inner moat 36 meter width (near circular portion) to 24 meter width (bottom of rectangular portion) x 1.2 meters depth
Outer moat 6 to 17 meters width

The tumulus is about 15 minutes on foot from Ōta Station on the Tōbu Railway.

Gallery

See also
List of Historic Sites of Japan (Gunma)

References

External links
 
https://www.pref.gunma.jp/contents/100156410.pdf Gunma Prefecture information] 
Ota City official site 

Kofun
History of Gunma Prefecture
Ōta, Gunma
Archaeological sites in Japan
Historic Sites of Japan